Port St. Joe High School (PSJHS) is located in Port St. Joe, Florida. It was A-rated three years in a row as of the 2016–17 school year. The school's athletic teams are known as the Tiger Sharks.

Notable alumni
Calvin Pryor, football player
Roman Quinn, baseball player

References

Educational institutions in the United States with year of establishment missing
Public high schools in Florida
Public middle schools in Florida
Schools in Gulf County, Florida
Port St. Joe, Florida